Fenofibrate/simvastatin, sold under the brand name Cholib, is a fixed-dose combination medication used to treat abnormal blood lipid levels when used in combination with a low-fat diet and exercise. It contains fenofibrate and simvastatin.

It was approved for use in the European Union in August 2013.

Medical uses 
Fenofibrate/simvastatin is indicated as adjunctive therapy to diet and exercise in high cardiovascular risk adults with mixed dyslipidemia to reduce triglycerides and increase HDL C levels when LDL C levels are adequately controlled with the corresponding dose of simvastatin monotherapy.

Adverse effects

References

Further reading

External links 
 
 

2-Methyl-2-phenoxypropanoic acid derivatives
17β-Hydroxysteroid dehydrogenase inhibitors
Benzophenones
Carboxylate esters
Chloroarenes
Combination drugs
Isopropyl esters
Lactones
Neuroprotective agents
Prodrugs
Secondary alcohols
Statins
Tetrahydropyrans